Mihoko (written: 美保子, 三保子 or 視穂子) is a feminine Japanese given name. Notable people with the name include:

, Japanese handball player
, Japanese alpine skier
, Japanese volleyball player
, Japanese high jumper
, Japanese operatic mezzo-soprano
, Japanese former football player
, Japanese women's professional shogi player

Japanese feminine given names